Pompey Centre District No. 10 Schoolhouse is a historic one-room school building located at Pompey Center in Onondaga County, New York.  It is a one-story frame building on a stone foundation, 24 feet wide and 32 feet deep. The roof features a small belfry. It was built in 1857 and ceased being used as a school in 1943.

It was listed on the National Register of Historic Places in 1998.

A related 1840 schoolhouse in Pompey was destroyed by fire in January 2010.

References

School buildings on the National Register of Historic Places in New York (state)
School buildings completed in 1857
One-room schoolhouses in New York (state)
Schoolhouses in the United States
Buildings and structures in Onondaga County, New York
National Register of Historic Places in Onondaga County, New York
1857 establishments in New York (state)